Yunus Carrim is a South African politician who served as the Minister of Communications from 2013–2014. Carrim is a self-proclaimed Marxist and serves on the South African Communist Party Central Committee and is a Politburo member.

Currently, Honorable Carrim is also a board member of The Parliamentary Network on the World Bank & International Monetary Fund.

References

Living people
South African politicians of Indian descent
Alumni of the University of Warwick
Communications ministers of South Africa
Year of birth missing (living people)
Members of the National Assembly of South Africa
Members of the National Council of Provinces